This is a list of notable manga artists. Romanized names are written in Western order (given names before family names), whereas kanji names are written in Japanese order (family names before given names). Many of them are pen names.

Individuals

A 

 
 
  (Creator of Touch, H2 and Cross Game)
 
 
 
 
 
 
 
 
 
  (Creator of A.I. Love You and Love Hina)
 
 
 
 
 
 
 
 
  (Creator of Reborn!)
 
 
 
 
 
 
 
 
 
 
 
 
 
 
 
 
 
 
 
  (Creator of Detective Conan)
 
 
  (Creator of Fullmetal Alchemist)
 
  (Creator of JoJo's Bizarre Adventure)
 
 
 
 
 
 
 
 
 
 
 
 
 
 
 
 
 
 
 
 
 
  (Creator of Azumanga Daioh and Yotsuba&!)

B

C

E 

 
 
  (Creator of Train Train (manga))
 
  (Creator of W Juliet)
 
 
 
  (Creator of Seduce Me After the Show)

F 

 
  (Creator of Happiness!)
 
 
  (Creator of Great Teacher Onizuka)
 
 
  (Creator of Makoto Call!)
 
  (Creator of Inu x Boku SS)
 
 
  (Creator of The Law of Ueki)
 
 
 
  (see Yoshiyuki Okamura)
 
 
 
 
 
 Fujiko Fujio (ふじお ふじ)

G

H 

 
 
  (Creator of Petit Eva: Evangelion@School)
  (Creator of Lady!!)
  (Creator of Mermaid Melody Pichi Pichi Pitch)
 Kazuichi Hanawa (花輪和一)
 
 
 
 
 
 
  (Creator of SS)
 
 
 
  (Creator of Yakitate!! Japan)
 
  (Creator of Hayate no Gotoku)
  
  (Creator of Ouran High School Host Club)
 
 
 
  (Creator of Neon Genesis Evangelion: Angelic Days)
  (Creator of Dorohedoro)
  (Creator of Hayate X Blade)
  (Creator of Maria-sama ga Miteru)
  (Creator of Magical Record Lyrical Nanoha Force)
  (Creator of Kuragehime)
 
 
  (Creator of Gakuen Alice and Portrait of M and N)
 
 
  (Creator of Hetalia: Axis Powers)
 
 
  (Creator of Vampire Knight)
  (Creator of Gundam SEED and Linebarrels of Iron)
  (Creator of Hellsing)
 
  (Creator of Black Lagoon)
 
 
  (Creator of Kōtarō Makaritōru!)
 
 
  (Creator of Higurashi no Naku Koro ni)
 
 
  (Creator of My Hero Academia)
  (Creator of D.Gray-Man)
 
 
 
 
  (Creator of Attention Please and Crest of the Royal Family)
 
  (Creator of Hikaru no Go)

I 

 
 
  (Creator of Bamboo Blade)
 
 
 
 
  (Creator of Rosario + Vampire)
 
 
  
 
 
  (Creator of Tokyo Mew Mew)
 Ichiko Ima (今 市子)
 
 
  (Writer of Eyeshield 21 and Dr. Stone)
 
 
  (Creator of Vagabond and Slam Dunk)
 
  (Creator of Murder Princess)
 , (Creator of Attack on Titan)
  (Creator of Tokyo Ghoul)
 
 
 
 
 
 
  (Creator of Piano no Mori)
 
 
 
  (Creator of Yu-Gi-Oh! R)
 
  (Writer of Shakugan no Shana and Haruhi Suzumiya)
 
 
 
 
 
 
 
 
 
  (Creator of Psyren)

J

K 
 
 
 
 
 
 
 
  (creator of K-On!)
 
 
 
 
 
 
 
 
 
 
 
 
 
 
 
 
 
 
  (Creator of Lupin III)
 
 
 
 
 
 
 
 
 
 
 
 
 
 
  (Creator of Addicted to Curry)
 
 
 
 
 
 
 
 
 
 
  (Creator of Naruto)
  (Creator of 666 Satan)
 
 
 
 
 
 
 
 
 
 
 
 
 
 
 
 
 
 
 
  aka  (Creator of Di Gi Charat and Kamichama Karin)
 
 
 
 
 
  (Creator of Nisekoi)
 
 
 
 
 
 
 
 
 
 
  (Creator of Bleach)
 
 
 
 
 
 
 
 
  (Creator of Saint Seiya)

M 
 
 
 
 
 
 
 
 
 
  (Creator of Fairy Tail)
 
 Hiroshi Masumura
 
 
 
 
 
 
 Masahiko Matsumoto
 
 
 
 
 
 
 
 
 
 Mineo Maya (魔夜峰央)
 
 
 
 
 
 
 , also writes as 
 
 
 
 
 
 
 
 
 
 
  (Creator of Berserk)
 
 
 
 
 
  (Creator of Nausicaä of the Valley of the Wind)
 
 
 
 
 
 
 
 
 
 
 
 
 
 
 
 
 
 
 
 
 
  (Creator of Chrono Crusade)
 
 
 
  (Creator of Dengeki Daisy)
 
 
 
  (Creator of Gravitation)
 
 
  (Illustrator of Eyeshield 21 and One Punch Man)

N 

  (Creator of Devilman, Cutie Honey, Mazinger Z, Violence Jack and Getter Robo)
 
 
 
 
  (Creator of Love Com)
 
 
 
  (Creator of Saint Young Men and Arakawa Under the Bridge)
  (Creator of Junjou Romantica and Sekai-ichi Hatsukoi)
  (Creator of Skip Beat!)
  (Creator of Bloom Into You)
 
 
 
 
 
 
 
 
 
 
  (Creator of Trigun and Blood Blockade Battlefront)

O 

  (Creator of Kodocha)
  (Co-Creator of Death Note and Bakuman)
 Ochazukenori
  (Creator of One Piece)
 
 
 
 
 
  (Co-Creator of Death Note and Bakuman)
  aka  (Creator of Air Gear)
 
 
 
 
 
 
 
  (Creator of Elfen Lied)
 
 
 
 Mari Okazaki (おかざき真里)
  (Creator of Afro Samurai)
  (Creator of Gantz)
  (Creator of Soul Eater and Fire Force)
  (Creator of Tenchi Muyo!)
  (Creator of One Punch Man, Mob Psycho 100 and Makai No Ossan)

R 

 
 
 
 
Robico (ろびこ) (Creator of My Little Monster)

S 

 
 
 
 
 
 
 
 
 
  (Also writes under ) (Creator of Sensitive Pornograph and Sekirei)
 
 
 
 
 
 
 
 
 
 
 
  (Co-creator of Highschool of the Dead)
 
  (Co-creator of Highschool of the Dead)
 
 
 
 
 
 
 
 
 
 
 
 
 
 
 
 
 
 
  (Creator of Red River)
 
 
 
 
 
 
 
  (Co-creator of The Promised Neverland)
 
 
 
 
 
 
 
 
 
 
  (Creator of Gin Tama)
 
 
 
 
 
  (Creator of D.N. Angel)
 
 
 
 
 
 
 
 
  (Creator of The Seven Deadly Sins)

T 

  (Creator of Black Clover)
 
 
 
 
  (Creator of Itazura na Kiss)
 
 
 
 
 
 
 
  (Creator of Yu-Gi-Oh!)
 
  (Creator of Ranma ½ and InuYasha)
 
 
 
 
 
 
  (Creator of The Tyrant Falls in Love)
 
 
Ichigo Takano (高野苺) (Creator of Orange (manga))
  (Creator of Until Death Do Us Part)
 
 
  (Creator of Rica 'tte Kanji!?)
  (Creator of Fruits Basket)
 
  (Creator of Shaman King)
 
  (Creator of various shōjo titles)
 
 
  (Creator of Bishoujo Senshi Sailor Moon)
  (Illustrator of Fate/stay night)
 
 
  (Creator of Gacha Gacha)
  (Creator of Beelzebub)
 
 
  (Kekkaishi)
 
 
  (Creator of Full Moon o Sagashite and Kamikaze Kaito Jeanne)
 
 
  (Creator of Yellow and Ka Shin Fu)
  (Illustrator of Full Metal Panic!)
 
 
 
 
 
 
 
 
  (Creator of Astro Boy and Jungle Taitei)
 
  (Creator of Black Butler)
 
  (Creator of YuYu Hakusho and Hunter × Hunter)
  (Creator of Me & My Brothers)
 
 
 
 
  (Illustrator of Higurashi no Naku Koro ni)
 
  (Creator of Dragon Ball and Dr. Slump)
 
 
  (Creator of Kare Kano)
  also writes yaoi under the name  (Creator of Princess Princess)
 
 
  (Creator of Penguin Revolution)
 Taku Tsumugi

U 

 
 
 
  (Creator of Peach Girl)
  (Creator of Tail of the Moon)
 
 
 
 
 
 
 
 
  (Creator of 20th Century Boys and Monster)

W 

 
 
 
 
 
 
 
 
  (Creator of Rurouni Kenshin)

Y 

 
  (Creator of Black Cat and illustrator of To Love-Ru)
 
 
 
 
 
 
 
 
 
 
 
 
  (Creator of Arm of Kannon)
 
 
 
 
 
 
 
 
 
 
 
 
 
 
 
 
 
 
 
 
 
 
 
 
 
 
 
 
 
 
 
  (Creator of Lucky☆Star)

Groups 
 
 
  (Creators of Angelic Layer, Chobits and Cardcaptor Sakura)
  (Creators of Doraemon)
 
  (Creators of Kannazuki no Miko and Shattered Angels)
  (Creators of DearS, Rozen Maiden, and Shugo Chara!)
 
  (Creators of Kinnikuman)

References

Manga

pl:Mangaka